Reuben Keane is an Australian professional rugby union referee.

Refereeing career
Keane has been refereeing since his early teens, and refereed at the 2018 Commonwealth Games as a 19-year old. In October 2021, he was an assistant referee during the 2021 Rugby Championship. On 16 February 2022, he was announced as a referee for the 2022 Super Rugby Pacific season.

References

Australian rugby union referees
Living people
ARU referees
Sportspeople from Canberra
Year of birth missing (living people)
Super Rugby referees